Thomas Lyons may refer to:

 Thomas Lyons (Medal of Honor) (1838–1904), American Civil War sailor and Medal of Honor recipient
 Thomas Lyons (politician) (1896–1985), Northern Irish politician
 Thomas G. Lyons (1931–2007), American Democratic Party politician from Chicago, Illinois
 Thomas William Lyons (1923–1988), bishop of the Roman Catholic Church in the United States
 Tom Lyons (1885–1938), English footballer
 Tommy Lyons, Irish Gaelic football manager
 Tommy Lyons (American football) (born 1948), former American football offensive lineman, now surgeon
 Thomas Lyons (British Army officer) (1829–1897), British general

See also 
 Thomas Lyon (disambiguation)